Londo may refer to:

People and fictional characters
 Dieudonné Londo (born 1976), Gabonese footballer
 Kai Londo (1845-1896), Kissi warrior from Sierra Leone
 Londo Mollari, from the science fiction television series Babylon 5
 Londo Bell, from Gundam's Universal Century timeline
 Brin Londo, the actual name of Timber Wolf (comics), one of the DC Comics Legion of Super-Heroes

Other uses
 Löndö Association, a political party in the Central African Republic
 Londo language, a Bantu language of the Democratic Republic of Congo

See also
 Lando (disambiguation)
 Londos, a list of people with the surname